Pablo Fernando Olivera Fernández (born 8 December 1987) is an Uruguayan professional footballer who currently plays as a forward for Sud América.

Club career
Olivera started his senior career playing with his hometown club Cerro Largo FC in 2005.

In mid-2007, he was loaned to Rampla Juniors for a year.

In August 2009, he signed a new deal with River Plate, team where he contributed with 16 goals in 47 matches. On 1 September 2010 he made his first international appearance playing the Copa Sudamericana against Paraguayan club Guaraní.

On 8 August 2012, Olivera joined Liga ZON Sagres side Moreirense F.C. for a year loan transfer. He made his debut on 19 August in a 1–1 draw against Paços de Ferreira, coming on a substitute for Pintassilgo. He scored his two first goals on 21 October in a 3–2 win Taça de Portugal match against Sporting Clube. He scored his first Primeira Liga goal on 27 October in a 2–2 draw against Olhanense.

References

External links

1987 births
Living people
People from Cerro Largo Department
Uruguayan footballers
Association football forwards
Cerro Largo F.C. players
Rampla Juniors players
Club Atlético River Plate (Montevideo) players
Moreirense F.C. players
Carabobo F.C. players
Central Español players
Deportivo Táchira F.C. players
Al-Wakrah SC players
Montevideo City Torque players
Atlético San Luis footballers
Centro Atlético Fénix players
Juventud de Las Piedras players
Sud América players
Uruguayan Primera División players
Primeira Liga players
Ascenso MX players
Venezuelan Primera División players
Qatar Stars League players
Uruguayan Segunda División players
Uruguayan expatriate footballers
Expatriate footballers in Portugal
Expatriate footballers in Venezuela
Expatriate footballers in Qatar
Expatriate footballers in Mexico
Uruguayan expatriate sportspeople in Portugal
Uruguayan expatriate sportspeople in Venezuela
Uruguayan expatriate sportspeople in Qatar
Uruguayan expatriate sportspeople in Mexico